The Kyivan Rus' Park (full name Ancient Kyiv in the "Kyivan Rus' Park") is a historical park and cultural center focused on the Kyivan Rus', near Kyiv, Ukraine. It puts on shows, cultural and historical festivals, horse-stunt shows, and international championships in ancient martial arts.   

The park integrates Rus' culture with that of medieval Europe. It is possible to see both Rus warriors and medieval knights typical of Europe.

Organization
The Slavic Fund charitable organization was founded to create a historical and cultural center about the Kyivan Rus'. The intent was to reconstitute and reconstruct the Kyiv Dytynets (the fortified part of Kyiv in the 5th to 13th century) with a maximum of historical, cultura, and architectural accuracy, as well as recreating the atmosphere of the epoch of Kyivan Rus'.

Location
The park is location in the village of Kopachiv, Obuhivskyi Raion, 34 km from Kyiv.

External links
Official website of Kyivan Rus' Park

References

Buildings and structures in Kyiv
Parks in Ukraine
Tourist attractions in Kyiv
Festivals in Ukraine